Upper Dir District is a district in Malakand Division of Khyber Pakhtunkhwa province in Pakistan. The city of Dir is the district headquarters. Badogai Pass connects it to Utror.

At the time of independence, Dir was a princely state ruled by Nawab Shah Jehan Khan. It was merged with Pakistan in 1969 and later on declared as a district in 1970. In 1996, the Dir District was divided into Upper and Lower Dir districts. This district is situated in the northern part of Pakistan. It borders Chitral district and Afghanistan on the north and northwest and Swat district to the east, and on the south by Lower Dir District.People of Dir are very hospitable. Dir is also called The Land of Hospitality and Brave People.

History
The British Raj honored Muhammad sharif Khan as Nawab of Dir in 1898 . By declaring his allegiance to the British Raj, Khan/Nawab, once exiled to Afghanistan by Umara Khan Mastkhel was seated as Nawab of Dir. He was succeeded by his son Nawab Aurang Zeb in 1904, who ruled until his death in 1925. His son Sir Shah Jehan succeeded him and ruled the state for 35 long years. He was dethroned and kept in house arrest in Lahore until his death in 1966 . He was succeeded by Mohammad Shah Khisro Khan. He left all the business at the mercy of his advisor, a man deputed by the Govt:of Pakistan to mould the state into a settled district through gradual implementation of laws. In 1969, it was merged as a district with Khyber Pakhtunkhwa. In 1996, Dir District was divided into two districts-Lower and Upper Dir- with Timergara and Dir as their respective headquarters.

Demographics 
At the time of the 2017 census the district had a population of 947,401, of which 466,594 were males and 480,766 females. Rural population was 903,301 (95.35%) while the urban population was 44,100 (4.65%). The literacy rate was 46.09% - the male literacy rate was 64.84% while the female literacy rate was 28.85%. 471 people in the district were from religious minorities.

Pashto was the predominant language, spoken by 90.78% of the population. Other languages, mainly various Kohistani languages, are spoken by 8.60% of the population.

Administration 
Upper Dir District has 3 Tehsils.
 Dir
 Sheringal
 Wari

National Assembly 
This district is represented by one elected MNA (Member of National Assembly) in Pakistan National Assembly. Its constituency is NA-5 (Upper Dir).

Provincial Assembly

Towns

Except for Dir and a number of rapidly growing bazaar towns along the main roads, the population is rural, scattered in more than 1200 villages in the deep narrow valleys of the Panjkora and its tributaries.

Of these, notable villages are

 Khas Dir
 Panakot
 Roghano Darra-Jelar
 Usheri
 Sundrawal
 Hattan
 Barawal Bandai
 Qashqaray
 Benr
 Nusrat
 Ben Shahi
 Sunai
 Surbat
 Kair
 Pataw (Patao)
 Kalkot
 patrak
 Sheringal
 Doog Dara
 Barawal
 chumra
 Gandigar
 Katan
Doryal
 Toormang
 Darorra
 Ganori
 Shalkani
 Wari
 Kakad
 Chaper

Division of Dir 

Popular places

 Qashqaray
 Panakot
 Kumrat Valley
 Kalkot
 Sheringal
 Bibyawar, Malakabad
 Doog Dara
 Ushirai Dara
 Shahi Koto
((Doryal kozkaly))
 Nehag Dara
 Barawal
 Ganori
 Gandigar
 Nowra
 Lowari Top
Seratai
sawni
Doryall
Guli Bagh Karo
 kakad
 Roghano Darra
 Wari City

See also 

 Dir (city)
 Dir (princely state)
 Lower Dir District
 Chitral District
 Swat District

References

 
Districts of Khyber Pakhtunkhwa